Susan Barnes may refer to:

 Sue Barnes (born 1952), Canadian politician
 Susan Barnes (computing), Apple Computer executive
 Susan Barnes (actress), in the TV series Titus
 Susan Barnes Carson (born 1942), née Susan Barnes, American serial killer
 Sue Barnes, a character in Peak Practice, played by Amelda Brown
 Suzanne Paul, née Susan Barnes, TV personality